Newbern Township is a township in Dickinson County, Kansas, USA.  As of the 2000 census, its population was 349.

Geography
According to the USGS, it contains two cemeteries: Farmington and Newburn.

The stream of West Branch Turkey Creek runs through this township.

Further reading

References

 USGS Geographic Names Information System (GNIS)

External links
 City-Data.com

Townships in Dickinson County, Kansas
Townships in Kansas